The 2011 International Origin series is the first time the rugby league International Origin has been played. This series was just a one-off match between England and Exiles RL to give England a good opposition mid-season in preparation for the 2011 Four Nations in November.

International Origin Match 
England side consisted of 16 players who had played internationally for England or Great Britain in the past but handed a debut to Wigan Warriors hooker Michael McIlorum who started on the bench. Whilst Jamie Jones-Buchanan from Leeds Rhinos was the 18th man.

The Exiles coach Brian McLennan had originally picked Warrington Wolves centre Matt King in his starting line-up but due to King wanting to witness the birth of his child McLennan moved Sia Soliola from the second-row to centre, with Louis Anderson coming off the bench to start at second row, this allowed Glenn Morrison (the 18th man) to start on the bench.

1st Half

Hull F.C.’s powerful second-rower Willie Manu provided the first try for the Exiles after Wigan Warriors Thomas Leuluai carved up the English defence and offloaded the ball. Winger Pat Richards provided the conversion. England soon hit back with prop James Graham making a half break before offloading the ball to Warrington Wolves scrum half Richie Myler to sprint 35 metres to score, Kevin Sinfield added the extras.

The Exiles were to strike next on the scoreboard though, some neat interplay from Rangi Chase, George Carmont and Glenn Morrison saw the Exiles go 55 metres in one play down the left  before Leuluai found Brett Hodgson in the centre of the field who provided a nice cross field kick into the arms of Tony Puletua who simply tapped it infield to St Helens R.F.C. team mate Francis Meli who had the easiest of scores.

2nd Half

However with 10 minutes to go Wigan Warriors second-rower Joel Tomkins intercepted a pass on his own 10 metre line and raced nearly the length of the field to score a try, Sinfield once again added the extras to put England into a 12-10 lead. But with a minute left on the clock, Chase offloaded a ball to Puletua who gave a pass to Carmont, Carmont then stepped inside to score the decisive try, Richards converted to give the Exiles their first International Origin win. Exiles stand-off Castleford Tigers Rangi Chase was the Man of the Match.

Teams

England RL

Exiles RL 
The Exiles team originally was supposed to have Matt King lining up at centre however due to his baby's birth he withdrew himself in the week preceding the match allowing Iosia Soliola to move into the centre, Louis Anderson to second-row and Glenn Morrison onto the bench.

References 

International Origin
International Origin